On 30 January 2010, the IUCN Red List of Threatened Species identified 9694 (4618 Animalia, 5075 Plantae, 1 Protista) Vulnerable species, subspecies and varieties, stocks and sub-populations.

For IUCN lists of vulnerable species by kingdom, see:

Animals (kingdom Animalia) — IUCN Red List vulnerable species (Animalia)
Amphibians — List of vulnerable amphibians
Birds — List of vulnerable birds
Fish — List of vulnerable fishes
Invertebrates — List of vulnerable invertebrates
Arthropods — List of vulnerable arthropods
Insects — List of vulnerable insects
Molluscs List of vulnerable molluscs
Mammals — List of vulnerable mammals
Reptiles — List of vulnerable reptiles
Fungi (kingdom Fungi) — IUCN Red List vulnerable species (Fungi)
Plants (kingdom Plantae) — IUCN Red List vulnerable species (Plantae)
Protists (kingdom Protista) — IUCN Red List vulnerable species (Protista)

References
 IUCN 2009. IUCN Red List of Threatened Species, v2009.2. Source of the above list: online IUCN Red List. Retrieved d.d. 4 March 2010.

IUCN